Tha Dok Kham is a sub-district (tambon) in Bueng Khong Long District, in Bueng Kan Province, northeastern Thailand. As of 2010, it had a population of 6,879 people and jurisdiction over 11 villages.

References

Tambon of Bueng Kan province
Populated places in Bueng Kan province
Bueng Khong Long District